Luis Abilio Sebastiani Aguirre (22 February 1935 – 10 August 2020) was a Peruvian Roman Catholic archbishop.

Sebastiani Aguirre was born in Peru and was ordained to the priesthood in 1962. He served as bishop of the Roman Catholic Diocese of Tarma, Peru, from 1992 to  2001 and then served as archbishop of the Roman Catholic Archdiocese of Ayacucho, Peru, from 2001 to 2011.

Notes

1935 births
2020 deaths
Peruvian Roman Catholic archbishops
Roman Catholic archbishops of Ayacucho
Roman Catholic bishops of Tarma